André Lorulot (born Georges André Roulot; 23 October 1885 – 11 March 1963) was a French individualist anarchist and freethinker. He founded and edited several newspapers in his lifetime. Later in his life, he abandoned anarchism to become a freethought propagandist.

References 

1885 births
1963 deaths
20th-century atheists
Freethought writers
French anarchists
French atheists
French editors
Individualist anarchists